Lloyd Zucker (23 March 1929 – 21 September 2009) was an Australian rules footballer who played for Port Adelaide Football Club in the South Australian National Football League during the 1950s.

References

1929 births
2009 deaths
Australian rules footballers from South Australia
Port Adelaide Football Club (SANFL) players
Port Adelaide Football Club players (all competitions)